The Kainantu–Goroka languages are a family of Papuan languages established by Arthur Capell in 1948 under the name East Highlands. They formed the core of Stephen Wurm's 1960 East New Guinea Highlands family (the precursor of Trans–New Guinea), and are one of the larger branches of Trans–New Guinea in the 2005 classification of Malcolm Ross.

Languages
The constituent Kainantu and Goroka families are clearly valid groups, and both William A. Foley and Timothy Usher consider their TNG identity to be established. The languages are:

 Goroka family
 Daulo
 Siane, Yaweyuha
 Gahuku: Alekano (Gahuku), Asaro River: Dano (Upper Asaro), Tokano (Lower Asaro)
 Benabena
 South Goroka: Fore, Gimi
 Isabi, Gende
 Henganofi
Abaga
Kamono (Kamano)
Fayatina River
Kanite, Inoke-Yate 
Yagaria
(?Ke’yagana) [subsumed under another language by Usher]
 Kainantu family
 Kenati
Tairoric (East Kainantu): Binumarien (Afaqina), Tairoa (North Tairora, Omwunra, Vinaata), Waffa
 Gauwa (West Kainantu)
Gadsup (Oyana, Akuna, Ontenu), Agarabi, Kambaira
Awa, Oweina
Auyana: Awiyaana (incl. Kosena), Usarufa

Pronouns
The pronouns reconstructed by Ross (2005) for proto-Kainantu–Goroka, proto-Kainantu, and proto-Goroka are as follows:

{|
|

| || 
{|
|+proto-Kainantu
! !!sg!!du!!pl
|-
!1
|*né||*té[ze]-||*té[ze]
|-
!2
|*é[ze]||*[te]né-||
|-
!3
|*wé|| || 
|}
| || 
{|
|+proto-Goroka
! !!sg!!pl
|-
!1
|*ná||*tá[za]
|-
!2
|*ká||*tá-na-gaza, *tí-na-gaza
|-
!3
|*[y]á||*[y]á-na-gaza, *í-na-gaza
|}
|}

The possessive forms are:

{|
|+proto-Kainantu–Goroka
! !!sg!!pl
|-
!1
|*na-i||*ta-i
|-
!2
|*ka||*tana-i
|-
!3
|*[y]a, *wa||*ya-i, *yana-i
|}

Evolution
Kainantu–Goroka reflexes of proto-Trans-New Guinea (pTNG) etyma are:

Awa language:
are 'ear' < *kand(e,i)k(V]
nu 'louse' < *niman

Tairora language:
ato 'ear' < *kand(e,i)k(V]
ir 'tree' < *inda
(n)am 'breast' < *amu
nume 'louse' < *niman
kubu 'short' < *k(a,u)tu(p,mb)aC
mi- 'give' < *mV-

Fore language:
na- 'eat' < *na-
numaa 'louse' < *niman
mi- 'give' < *mV-
amune 'egg' < *mun(a,i,u)ka
kasa 'new' < *kVndak
mone 'nose' < *mundu

Gende language:
ami 'breast' < *amu
mut 'belly' < *mundun 'internal organs'
mina- 'stay' < *mVna-
nogoi 'water < *[n]ok
(tu)nima 'louse' < *niman
me- 'give' < *mV-

Innovations in proto-Kainantu-Goroka replacing proto-Trans-New Guinea forms:
 *tá[za] '1pl' replaces pTNG *ni, *nu
 *tá-na '2pl' replaces pTNG *ŋgi, *ja
genitive forms ending in *-i

Vocabulary
Gorokan basic vocabulary from William A. Foley (1986):

{| class="wikitable sortable"
! gloss !! Proto-Gorokan !! Gende !! Siane !! Benabena !! Kamono–Yagaria !! Fore
|-
| 'two' || *tote || ogondrari || lele || loe || lole || tara
|-
| 'man' || *we || vei || we || vo || ve || wa
|-
| 'water' || *no(k) || nogoi || no || nagami || ni(na) || wani
|-
| 'fire' ||  || tuva || yo || logo || hali || yakuʔ
|-
| 'tree' || *ya || izo || ya || yafa || yava || yaː
|-
| 'leaf' ||  || kuruma || aila || haya(ʔa) || haeya || aʔyeʔ
|-
| 'root' || *supa || tovaya || lufawa || lufusa(ʔa) || havu || aubu
|-
| 'house' || *nom || nomu || numu(na) || no(hi) || yo(na) || naːmaʔ
|-
| 'breast' || *ami || ami- || ami(na) || amiha(ʔa) || ami(maʔa) || nono
|-
| 'tooth' || *wa || va(iza) || auma || yogo(ʔa) || (ä)vep || (a)wa
|-
| 'bone' || *yampu || yami- || auma || felisa(ʔa) || (a)pu(va) || (a)yaːmpu
|-
| 'ear' || *ke/a || ka- || ka(la) || (e)kesa(ʔa) || (ä)geta || (a)ge
|-
| 'hair' || *yoka || yogo || yowa(la) || oka(ʔa) || (a)yokaʔ || (a)yaːʔ
|-
| 'leg' || *kia || kia- || kiya(na) || gigusa(ʔa) || (a)gia || (a)gisaː
|-
| 'blood' || *kota || mamia- || wanu || golaha(ʔa) || gola(na) || koraːʔ
|-
| 'hand' || *ya || ya || a(na) || yaha(ʔa) || (ä)ya || ya
|-
| 'egg' || *mut || mura || mula || mu(ʔa) || mu(na) || amuʔ
|-
| 'sun' || *po || po || fo || yafi || yafo || yaːbu
|-
| 'axe' || *tu || tu || luna || lu || lu || tuʔ
|-
| 'netbag' || *ko || ko || owo || gu(ʔi) || gu(na) || koʔ
|-
| 'eat' || *na- || na- || n- || na- || no- || na-
|-
| 'die' || *puti- || pri- || fol- || fili- || fili- || puri-
|-
| 'say' || *si- || ti- || l- || li- || hi- || i-
|-
| 'give' || *mi- || imi- || om- || m- || mi- || mi-
|-
| 'big' || *(n)ampa || namba || namba || napa || legepa || tabe
|}

Kainantu basic vocabulary from William A. Foley (1986):

{| class="wikitable sortable"
! gloss !! Awa !! Auyana !! Gadsup !! Tairora
|-
| 'two' || tɔtare || kaiʔa || kaantani || taaraʔanta
|-
| 'man' || wɛ || waiya || banta || bainti
|-
| 'water' || no || nomba || nomi || namari
|-
| 'fire' || ira || irama || ikai || iha
|-
| 'tree' || ta || taima || yaani || katari
|-
| 'leaf' || ɔnɔ || anama || anai || mare
|-
| 'root' || anuʔ || anuʔa || anuʔi || tuʔa
|-
| 'house' || nɔ || naamba || maʔi || naabu
|-
| 'breast' || nɔ || naamba || naami || naama
|-
| 'tooth' || awɛ || awaiyamba || abakuni || aabai
|-
| 'bone' || ayɔnta || ayaantamba || ayampai || buhaarima
|-
| 'ear' || ɔre || aʔa || aakami || aato
|-
| 'hair' || (a)yɔra || aayara || -nyoi || kauhi
|-
| 'leg' || ai || aisamima || akani || aiʔu
|-
| 'blood' || nɛe || naema || naarei || naare
|-
| 'hand' || ayɔnobeh || ayamba || aayaami || kauʔu
|-
| 'egg' || au || auma || amuʔi || auru
|-
| 'sun' || popoʔnah || aabauma || ikona || kauri
|-
| 'axe' || konaro || koraroba || kuntaʔi || kaarima
|-
| 'netbag' || unɔ || unaamba || unaami || uta
|-
| 'eat' || nɔno || nare || naano || naana
|-
| 'die' || pukire || pukai || pukono || ʔutubiro
|-
| 'say' || iraruwo || siyo || seʔu || tiena
|-
| 'give' || awiʔ || ami || ameno || amina
|-
| 'big' || aanotɔ || anomba || inoʔna || nora
|}

Proto-languages
Some lexical reconstructions of Proto-East Kainantu and Proto-North Kainantu by Usher (2020) are:

{| class="wikitable sortable"
! gloss !! Proto-East Kainantu !! Proto-North Kainantu
|-
| head || *piᵄtɐ || *noːN
|-
| hair/feather || *jɐᵘsi || *jɐᵘ
|-
| ear || *ɑːtoː || *ɑːʔ
|-
| eye || *wu || *u
|-
| nose || *ipi || *siʔ
|-
| tooth || *wɐⁱ || *wɐj
|-
| tongue || *m₂ɑːpiɾi || *[m/n][ɐⁱ]piɾ
|-
| leg || *ipu || *tɐɾ
|-
| blood || *wi[ʔt]ipɐ || *nɑːɾeː
|-
| bone || *muʔjɑːni || *(ɐ-)jɐNpɐ
|-
| breast || *nɑːNmɐ || *nɑːN
|-
| louse || *numɐ || *nuN
|-
| dog || *w₂ɐⁱni || *ijɐN
|-
| pig || *p₂uᵄɾɐ || *poːɾ
|-
| bird || *inɑːmɐ; *uwini || *nuN
|-
| egg || *uɾu || *uɾ
|-
| tree || *jɐtɐɾi || *jɑːj
|-
| sun || *j₂uᵄni || *ɑːʔ
|-
| moon || *[u]toːnɐ || *wi[ɾ]oːN
|-
| water || *noːni || *noːN
|-
| fire || *iʔjɐ || *itɐ
|-
| stone || *oːni || *oː[ɾ/j]
|-
| path || *ɑːni || *ɑːj
|-
| man || *wɐⁱ-iNti || *wɑːⁱNsɐ
|-
| woman || *ɐnɑːjeː || *ɐnɑːsi
|-
| name || *utu || *wiʔ
|-
| eat || *nɐ- || 
|-
| one || *moːʔjɑː || *mɐnɑː
|-
| two || *tɑːɾɐ || *tɑːN
|}

See also
East New Guinea Highlands languages, an expansion of Kainantu–Goroka in Wurm 1975, which was later abandoned by Ross due to a lack of unifying morphological data.

Bibliography

Ross, Malcolm. 2014. Proto-Kainantu-Goroka. TransNewGuinea.org.
Ross, Malcolm. 2014. Proto-Goroka. TransNewGuinea.org.
Ross, Malcolm. 2014. Proto-Kainantu. TransNewGuinea.org.
Proto-Eastern Kainantu-Goroka. TransNewGuinea.org. From Scott, G. 1978. The Fore language of Papua New Guinea. Canberra: Pacific Linguistics.
Proto-Eastern-Central Gorokan. TransNewGuinea.org. From Scott, G. 1978. The Fore language of Papua New Guinea. Canberra: Pacific Linguistics.

References

External links 
 Timothy Usher, New Guinea World, Kainantu

 
Languages of Papua New Guinea
Morobe–Eastern Highlands languages